Alfred Edwin (Shelly) Shelhamer   (November 30, 1918 - November 7, 1986) was an American Thoroughbred horse racing  jockey.

In 1940 he rode Level Best, Champion 2 year old filly, to a 5 length victory in the Old Colony Stake at Narragansett Park. He was under contract to Hall of Fame trainer H. Guy Bedwell and rode most of his races on the Maryland circuit until his retirement in 1945.

The best horse that he rode was U.S. Triple Crown Champion and two time Horse of the Year Whirlaway.

After hanging up his tack, Mr. Shelhamer became a racing official in varying capacities. It was his use of riding knowledge that helped further the use of the Film Patrol in monitoring races at the track. He was one of three stewards at the very first Breeder's Cup at Hollywood Park Racetrack in 1984 that saw the winner Wild Again remain in first position after a roughly run stretch drive. Gate Dancer was taken down from 2nd to 3rd for interference and Slew o' Gold was moved up to second in a race long remembered.

Mr. Shelhamer died in Hollywood, CA in 1986.

References

American jockeys
1918 births
1986 deaths